Achatinella is a tropical genus of colorful land snails in the monotypic Achatinellidae subfamily Achatinellinae.  Species are arboreal pulmonate gastropod mollusks with some species called Oʻahu tree snails or kāhuli in the Hawaiian language.

Achatinella species are all endemic to the island of Oahu in Hawaii, and all remaining extant species are endangered. They were once abundant and were mentioned extensively in Hawaiian folklore and songs, and their shells were used in lei and other ornaments.

Many of the species are sinistral or left-handed chirality in their spiral shell coiling, whereas most gastropod shells are dextral, with a right handed spiral.

Distribution 
There were  41 species of Achatinella endemic to the Hawaiian island of Oʻahu, though only 13 species survive. Some species have less than 50 remaining individuals, and others have +300; many species fall in between.

Conservation status 
All 13 species are listed under United States federal legislation as endangered. The IUCN lists a number of Achatinella species as extinct and the remainder as critically endangered. The main cause of decline has been attributed to over collection. In addition, invasive species such as rats, Jackson's chameleons, and the highly predatory snail Euglandina rosea have been involved in the extinctions and declines of the native tree snails.

Shell description 
Most have smooth glossy, and oblong or ovate shells which show a variety of colors, including yellow, orange, red, brown, green, gray, black, and white.

There are three recognized subgenera within the genus Achatinella. Subgenera are distinguished according to shells characteristics only.

Genus Achatinella Swainson, 1828: The dextral or sinistral shell is imperforate or minutely perforate, oblong, ovate or globose-conic; smooth or
longitudinally corrugated, with only weak traces of spiral sculpture. Shell color is in spiral bands or streaks in the direction of the growth lines.  The lip is simple or thickened within and sometimes slightly expanding. The columella bears a strong callous fold. Type species of the genus Achatinella is Achatinella apexfulva (Dixon).

Subgenus Bulimella Pfeiffer, 1854: Shell shape is oblong-conic or ovate. The spire is obtuse, rounded or convexly-conic near the apex. The outer lip is thickened by a strong callous rib within the aperture (except in Achatinella abbreviata and Achatinella lila). Type species of the subgenus Bulimella is Achatinella byronii Newcomb.

Subgenus Achatinellastrum Pfeiffer, 1854: The shell is imperforate, ovate-conic or oblong-conic and smooth. The embryonic whorls are not flattened. The outer lip is thin or only slightly thickened within the apex but not expanded. These are the most generally distributed of
the Achatinella species and show a prolific area of intergrading color patterns. Type species of the subgenus Achatinellastrum is Achatinella stewartii (Green, 1827).

Ecology

Habitat 
These snails live in trees. Currently they are only found in mountainous dry to moist forests and shrublands above . Most individuals spend their entire life on just one tree.

Feeding 
These tree snails are nocturnal, and feed by grazing fungus which grows on the surface of native plant leaves.

Although these tree snails are occasionally found on introduced plants, it is unknown whether or not the fungus which grows on these plants can provide long-term support for healthy breeding populations of these snails.

In captivity Achatinella feed on fungus growing on leaves of Metrosideros polymorpha. They also feed on cornstarch, which can be spread in terraria with water and on cultures of sooty mold grown on laboratory agar. In captivity, cuttlebone is used as a source for calcium.

Life cycle 
Adult snails are hermaphroditic (having both male and female reproductive organs) and can live for many years. These are live bearing snails (give birth to live snails instead of laying eggs).

Predation and other threats 
Because growth rate and fertility are very low, these snails are especially vulnerable to loss of individuals through human collection, through predation, or because of other disturbances.

The most serious threats to the survival of Oʻahu tree snails are predation by the introduced carnivorous snail Euglandina rosea, predation by rats (Rattus exulans, Rattus norvegicus, Rattus rattus), and loss of habitat due to the spread of non-native vegetation into higher elevation forests.

Jackson's chameleon Trioceros jacksonii, that was introduced to Hawaii in early 1970s, is a serious threat to Achatinella, because it directly preys on them and on other snails too. Other predators of Achatinella include the land planarian Platydemus manokwari.

Predators of Achatinella:

Hawaiian folklore 

According to Ancient Hawaiian folklore, the kāhuli are known as the pūpū kani oe, which translates to "shell that sounds long" or the "singing shell". They are believed to be able vocalize and sing at night. Experts have attributed this association to the chirping of crickets at night when the snails are active. Native Hawaiians used the shells of the snails to create kahuli shell lei and their status as coveted souvenirs in the 19th-century may have contributed to the decline of the species. The summer palace of King Kamehameha III was called Kaniakapupu ("the singing of the land shells") because of the many snails which once inhabited the area during his lifetime.

Species 
There are 41 species in the genus Achatinella:

Subgenus Achatinella 
 †Achatinella apexfulva (Dixon, 1789)
 Achatinella cestus Newcomb, 1853
 Achatinella concavospira Pfeiffer, 1859
 †Achatinella decora (Férussac, 1821)
 Achatinella leucorraphe (Gulick, 1873)
 Achatinella lorata Férussac, 1824
 Achatinella mustelina Mighels, 1845
 Achatinella swiftii Newcomb, 1853
 Achatinella turgida Newcomb, 1853
 †Achatinella valida Pfeiffer, 1855
 Achatinella vittata Reeve, 1850

Subgenus Bulimella 
 †Achatinella abbreviata Reeve, 1850
 Achatinella bulimoides Swainson, 1828
 Achatinella byronii (Wood, 1828)
 Achatinella decipiens Newcomb, 1854
 †Achatinella elegans Newcomb, 1853
 Achatinella fuscobasis (E. A. Smith, 1873)
 Achatinella lila Pilsbry, 1914
 Achatinella pulcherrima Swainson, 1828
 Achatinella pupukanioe Pilsbry & Cooke, 1914
 Achatinella sowerbyana Pfeiffer, 1855
 Achatinella taeniolata Pfeiffer, 1846
 Achatinella viridans Mighels, 1845

Subgenus Achatinellastrum 
 Achatinella bellula E. A. Smith, 1873
 †Achatinella buddii Newcomb, 1853
 †Achatinella casta Newcomb, 1853
 †Achatinella caesia Gulick, 1858
 Achatinella curta Newcomb, 1853
 †Achatinella dimorpha Gulick, 1858
 Achatinella fulgens Newcomb, 1853
 †Achatinella juddii Baldwin, 1895
 †Achatinella juncea Gulick, 1856
 †Achatinella lehuiensis E. A. Smith, 1873
 †Achatinella livida Swainson, 1828
 †Achatinella papyracea Gulick, 1856
 Achatinella phaeozona Gulick, 1856
 †Achatinella spaldingi Pilsbry & Cooke, 1914
 Achatinella stewartii (Green, 1827)
 †Achatinella thaanumi Pilsbry & Cooke, 1914
 Achatinella vulpina (Férussac, 1824)

References 
This article incorporates public domain text (a public domain work of the United States Government) from reference.

Further reading 
 Bland T. & Binney W. G. (1874) "On the lingual dentition and anatomy of Achatinella and other Pulmonata". Annals of the Lyceum of Natural History of New York. 10: 331-351.

External links 
 
 
 Genus profile at U. S. Fish and Wildlife Service
 Endangered Species in the Pacific Islands

.
Gastropod genera
Molluscs of Hawaii
Endangered fauna of Hawaii
Biota of Hawaii (island)
Biota of Kauai
Biota of Maui
Biota of Oahu